Vandika Ervandovna Avetisyan (born October 5, 1928) is a Doctor of Biology and a noted Armenian botanist and mycologist. She has worked and explored extensively in her native Armenia under the auspices of the Institute of Botany of the Armenian National Academy of Sciences. Her alma mater is Yerevan State University, the oldest and most prestigious of Yerevan's universities. .

Alternative Names
Avetissjan, Vanda E. ; Avetisian, Vanda E. ; Avetissian, Vanda E.

See also
List of women botanists
List of Armenian scientists and philosophers
Lists of Armenians
List of female scientists in the 20th century
List of female scientists in the 21st century

References

1928 births
Living people
Armenian botanists
Women botanists
Mycologists
Soviet mycologists